Boundless by CSMA (formerly CSMA Club and previously the Civil Service Motoring Association) is an experiences club that helps public sector workers get the most from their free time. Established in 1923 (when it was the Civil Service Motoring Club), it is open to past and present members of the UK Civil Service and public sector plus organisations that were formerly part of the British Civil Service, for instance Royal Mail and BT. Relatives of existing members may also join.

History

Boundless by CSMA is a mutual organisation. It was founded as the Civil Service Motoring Association in 1923 by Frank Vernon Edwards, an executive officer in the Ministry of Labour who had an interest in motorcycle trials.

Services

Originally concentrating on the sporting and leisure activities associated with motoring, Boundless by CSMA has developed into primarily a provider of membership benefits in motoring, lifestyle and leisure areas. Today its member benefits include discounts on insurance, shopping, holidays, banking, attraction tickets, cinema, travel, leisure and roadside rescue, providing these through relationships with Approved Partners, notably LV= Insurance, with which it has worked since 1923.

Members of the club also have access to a range of clubs and groups focusing on hobbies and interests from classic cars to photography, as well as a range of events throughout the UK.

Britannia Rescue

CSMA Club formerly owned and operated a vehicle breakdown rescue service for members and the general public, branded Britannia Rescue. In 2007, CSMA sold Britannia Rescue to Liverpool Victoria, the owner of the Frizzell Insurance brand (now known as LV=).

Boundless Breaks – hotels, cottages, leisure parks

Boundless by CSMA owns and operates a number of "Holiday and Leisure properties" in the UK. These currently include
Ghyll Manor Hotel & Restaurant, a Country House Hotel in West Sussex
Cotswold Cottages, self-catering cottages in Gloucestershire
Whitemead Forest Park, a holiday park in Parkend, Forest of Dean.
Bournemouth West Cliff Hotel in Bournemouth 

Although the general public can stay at any of the properties, members and their families and guests receive a considerable discount on tariffs.

Cotswold Motoring Museum

Boundless by CSMA is owner of the  Cotswold Motoring Museum in Bourton-on-the-Water, Gloucestershire.

Magazine

The club magazine, called Boundless, was formerly known as Club Life and before that Motoring & Leisure. It is the largest circulated motoring magazine in the UK. The magazine used to be distributed to members who paid a subscription. From 2009 the magazine is included in the yearly membership fee and distributed to all members 6 times a year. The magazine covers a range of topics from holidays and leisure to motoring and reviews.

References

External links
 

Civil Service Motoring Association, The
Civil Service (United Kingdom)
Motor clubs
Organisations based in Brighton and Hove
Organizations established in 1923
1923 establishments in the United Kingdom